This is a list of Pakistani music channels. These are current and past music channels in Pakistan with their launching year, closing year, network, headquarter, languages, and slogans arranged alphabetically.

Channels

See also 
 List of television channels in Pakistan
 List of news channels in Pakistan

References 

Lists of television channels in Pakistan
Television stations in Pakistan
Music television channels
Music organisations based in Pakistan